The 12th District of the Iowa Senate is located in southwestern Iowa, and is currently composed of Fremont, Mills, Montgomery, Page, Ringgold, and Taylor Counties.

Current elected officials
Mark Costello is the senator currently representing the 12th District.

The area of the 12th District contains two Iowa House of Representatives districts:
The 23rd District (represented by David Sieck)
The 24th District (represented by Cecil Dolecheck)

The district is also located in Iowa's 3rd congressional district, which is represented by U.S. Representative Cindy Axne.

Past senators
The district has previously been represented by:

Ted J. Anderson, 1983–1984
Joy Corning, 1985–1990
Harry Slife, 1991–1993
Donald Redfern, 1994–2002
Kitty Rehberg, 2003–2004
Brian Schoenjahn, 2005–2012
Joni Ernst, 2013–2014
Mark Costello, 2015–present

See also
Iowa General Assembly
Iowa Senate

References

12
Fremont County, Iowa
Mills County, Iowa
Montgomery County, Iowa
Page County, Iowa
Ringgold County, Iowa
Taylor County, Iowa